Henry Vincent Hodson (12 May 1906 – 26 March 1999) was an English economist and editor.

Career
Hodson was born in Edmonton, London. He was educated at Gresham's School, Holt, and Balliol College, Oxford, becoming a Fellow of All Souls College, Oxford, in 1928. He was later a member of the Economic Advisory Council and Editor of The Round Table from 1934–1939. He was Director of the Empire Division of the Ministry of Information from 1939 to 1941, then became Reforms Commissioner of the Government of India.

Returning to England in 1942, he was made Principal Assistant Secretary and later Head of Non-Munitions, at the Ministry of Broadcast until 1945.

At the end of the Second World War, he returned to journalism, becoming assistant editor of The Sunday Times, and was editor from 1950 until 1961. He was editor of The Annual Register from 1973 until his retirement in 1988. He died on 26 March 1999.

From 1927, Hodson was a freeman of the Mercers' Company by right of patrimony.  In 1964, he was Master of the company.  He was made Provost of the Ditchley Foundation in 1961. 

He was on the governing body of Abingdon School from 1972–1986.

Personal life
In 1933 he married Margaret Elizabeth Honey.

He died in Kensington and Chelsea, London in 1999, aged 92.

Publications

Hodson's publications include:

Economics of a Changing World (1933), 
The Empire in the World (1937),  
Slump and Recovery (1929, revised 1937 and 1938), 
The British Commonwealth and the Future (1939), 
Twentieth Century Empire (1948), 
Problems of Anglo-American Relations (1963), 
The Great Divide: Britain-India-Pakistan (1969), and 
The Diseconomics of Growth (1972).

References

External links
Henry Vincent Hodson at Athelstane E-Texts

1906 births
1999 deaths
Alumni of Balliol College, Oxford
British male journalists
Editors of the Round Table Journal
Fellows of All Souls College, Oxford
People educated at Gresham's School
20th-century British economists
Governors of Abingdon School